Micryletta steinegeri (common names: Stejneger's paddy frog, Stejneger's narrow-mouthed toad, paddy frog, Taiwan little pygmy frog) is a species of frog in the family Microhylidae. It is endemic to central and southern Taiwan. In the past it has also been considered as a synonym of Micryletta inornata from continental Asia.

Description
It has a slender body that is brown in colour, with irregular dark markings. Colouration varies a lot among individuals. Arms of front legs are orange. Breeding takes place in late spring and early summer in explosive breeding events. The tadpoles are almost transparent.

Range
Its range is fragmented within central and southern Taiwan. It is also present in Kenting National Park.

Habitat and conservation
Micryletta steinegeri inhabits broadleaf forests, sometimes also to be found in cultivated fields and orchards. Tadpoles develop in temporary rainwater pools, blocked ditches and cisterns. It is a rare frog known only from few localities. It is threatened by habitat loss.

References

Micryletta
Endemic fauna of Taiwan
Amphibians of Taiwan
Taxa named by George Albert Boulenger
Amphibians described in 1909
Taxonomy articles created by Polbot